Joe DePre (born December 19, 1947) is an American former professional basketball player. He played three seasons as a shooting guard in the American Basketball Association (ABA), all as a member of the New York Nets (1970–73). He was drafted in the second round (29 overall) of the 1970 NBA draft from St. John's University by the Phoenix Suns, but he never played for them.

External links

1947 births
Living people
American men's basketball players
Basketball players from New York (state)
New York Nets players
People from Westbury, New York
Phoenix Suns draft picks
Shooting guards
Sportspeople from Nassau County, New York
St. John's Red Storm men's basketball players
Wilkes-Barre Barons players